Vorkapić is a surname distributed on the territory of Croatia and Serbia. The surname Vorkapić (including: Vorkapich, Vorkapic, Forkapic) in lower amount is present in 14 world countries on three continents.

Notable people with the surname include:
Slavko Vorkapić (1894–1976), film director and editor
Jasna Vorkapić-Furač (born 1942), a scientist
Vlatka Vorkapic (born 1969), movie director
Đurđica Vorkapić, designer and owner of the "Hippy Garden"  fashion brand    
Ljubomir Vorkapić (born 1967), football player

Serbian surnames
Croatian surnames